The 2005 ECAC Hockey Men's Ice Hockey Tournament was the 44th tournament in league history. It was played between March 4 and March 19, 2005. Opening round and quarterfinal games were played at home team campus sites, while the final four games were played at the Pepsi Arena (subsequently renamed Times Union Center) in Albany, New York. By winning the tournament, Cornell received the ECAC's automatic bid to the 2005 NCAA Division I Men's Ice Hockey Tournament.

Conference standings
Note: GP = Games played; W = Wins; L = Losses; T = Ties; PTS = Points; GF = Goals For; GA = Goals Against

Bracket
Teams are reseeded after the first round and quarterfinals

Note: * denotes overtime period(s)

First round

(5) Dartmouth vs. (12) Yale

(6) Brown vs. (11) Renssealer

(7) St. Lawrence vs. (10) Princeton

(8) Union vs. (9) Clarkson

Quarterfinals

(1) Cornell vs. (9) Clarkson

(2) Harvard vs. (7) St. Lawrence

(3) Colgate vs. (6) Brown

(4) Vermont vs. (5) Dartmouth

Semifinals

(1) Cornell vs. (4) Vermont

(2) Harvard vs. (3) Colgate

Third place

(3) Colgate vs. (4) Vermont

Championship

(1) Cornell vs. (2) Harvard

Tournament awards

All-Tournament Team
F Kevin Du (Harvard)
F Matt Moulson (Cornell)
F Daniel Pegoraro (Cornell)
D Charlie Cook* (Cornell)
D Joey Mormina (Colgate)
G David McKee (Cornell)
* Most Outstanding Player(s)

References

External links
ECAC Hockey

ECAC Hockey Men's Ice Hockey Tournament
ECAC tournament